"Scoutrageous" is an episode of the British comedy television series The Goodies.

This episode is also known as "Scouting Adventures" and "Boy Scouts".

Written by The Goodies, with songs and music by Bill Oddie.

Plot
Graeme and Bill are curious — Tim has been acting in a suspicious manner. They decide to follow Tim, and find that he is a scout, with the name "Brown Owl". Bill and Graeme are jealous of him — they want to be scouts, too. So Tim allows them to join — however, their behaviour is so bad because of their merely boyish planks that they are quickly drummed out of the Scouts by Tim.

On the outer, Graeme and Bill become bad masked scouts (the "Lone Scout, plus One"), who create havoc with their own special brand of 'Bob A Job', where they demand money, or they will do a job (they demand £500 from Tim, and then £1000 from other people).  They also cause problems for people as they work towards getting their 'Wig-spotters Badge' and 'World Domination Badge'. Graeme comments to Bill that there are only three people who had ever received  the "World Domination Badge" — Alexander the Great, Julius Caesar and David Frost (although Graeme says Frost had actually pinched his badge). The actions of Bill and Graeme result in the Scouts becoming an illegal organisation, and Tim and the other scouts are forced to hide their scouting membership from the Scoutfinder General.

The Scoutfinder General decides to trick Tim into revealing that he is a scout, by saying: "Dyb, Dyb, Dyb" with Tim then joining in with: "Dob, D-shhhhhhhhhh!"  The Scoutfinder General asked sharply: "WHAT WAS THAT?!" to which Tim replied nervously: "N-nothing."

Accusingly, the Scoutfinder General said: "You said dob!" to which Tim replied, speaking very quickly: "only one though, one dob, not three dobs." Tim continues to deny that he is a scout, so the Scoutfinder General drums his fingers on his desk, and Tim and his scout group cannot help themselves — they burst into a scouting song ("On The Crest Of A Wave"). The Scoutfinder General looks smug and triumphant at his success, and Tim and his scout group are then convicted of being scouts.

Deprived of the scouts, Tim joins the Salvation Army (in which he is the only man — appearing as both a Sergeant and Field Marshal). Tim battles the mysterious masked bad scouts with the help of his all-women troops from the Salvation Army, as well as the all-women troops from the Salvation Navy and the all-women troops from the Salvation Air force.

Cultural references
The character "Scout Finder General" is loosely based on the "Kessler" character from the BBC drama series The Secret Army.
 Scout Movement
 McCarthyism and witch hunts in general
 Salvation Army
 Gang Show (when Tim and his Scout group sing "On The Crest of A Wave")
 Alexander the Great
 Julius Caesar
 David Frost

DVD and VHS releases

This episode has been released on both DVD and VHS.

References

 "The Complete Goodies" — Robert Ross, B T Batsford, London, 2000
 "The Goodies Rule OK" — Robert Ross, Carlton Books Ltd, Sydney, 2006
 "From Fringe to Flying Circus — 'Celebrating a Unique Generation of Comedy 1960-1980'" — Roger Wilmut, Eyre Methuen Ltd, 1980
 "The Goodies Episode Summaries" — Brett Allender
 "The Goodies — Fact File" — Matthew K. Sharp
 "TV Heaven" — Jim Sangster & Paul Condon, HarperCollinsPublishers, London, 2005

External links

The Goodies (series 7) episodes
1977 British television episodes